Armactica columbina is a moth of the family Nolidae first described by Francis Walker in 1865. It is found in the Australian states of New South Wales, Queensland and the north of Western Australia.

The wingspan is about 20 mm. Adults have dark grey forewings with a grey, then white, brown and black band along the outer edge, a small blue eyespot near the centre and a row of five eyespots in each brown band. The hindwings are yellow with a black border.

The larvae have been recorded feeding on Cordia subcordata.

References

Chloephorinae